"Tror du att han bryr sig" is a song performed by Swedish singers Benjamin Ingrosso and Felix Sandman. A Swedish language version of Ingrosso's 2017 single "Do You Think About Me", the edited version was released as a digital download on 4 May 2018 by TEN Music Group and Sony Music. The song peaked at number 7 on the Swedish Singles Chart, was certified platinum in Sweden in August 2018 and 2× platinum in February 2020.

Music video
A music video to accompany the release of "Tror du att Han Bryr Sig" was first released onto YouTube on 3 May 2018 at a total length of two minutes and fifty-three seconds.

Track listing

Charts

Weekly charts

Year-end charts

Certifications

Release history

References

2018 singles
2018 songs
Benjamin Ingrosso songs
Felix Sandman songs
Songs written by Benjamin Ingrosso
Songs written by Hampus Lindvall